Mae Khong is a village and tambon (sub-district) of Mae Sariang District, in Mae Hong Son Province, Thailand. In 2005 it had a population of 4,154. The tambon contains 11 villages.

References

Tambon of Mae Hong Son province
Populated places in Mae Hong Son province